The Chinese Association for Relief and Ensuing Services (also known as the CARES), formerly the Free China Relief Association, is a non-governmental organization headquartered in Taipei, Republic of China (Taiwan). The organization specializes in forced migration, refugee assistance and disaster relief.

History 

The Free China Relief Association was founded in 1949 and incorporated on 4 April 1950, as the "Chinese Mainland Relief Association", following the defeat and retreat of the Republic of China from the mainland. The Association was tasked with providing assistance to frontline troops, the many refugees fleeing the Mainland after the war, assisting the Nationalist insurgents operating within Mainland China and generally promoting the values of free China on behalf of the ROC.

The articles of association listed 100 people as directors including Ju Zheng, Soong Mei-ling, Ku Cheng-kang, Fu Ssu-nien, Fang Chih, and Zheng Yanfen. The first meeting took place between 12 and 24 April 1950.

1950s 

In 1950, with the CCP was strengthening its hold over the former Republic of China. The FCRA conducted hundreds of operations to airdrop 70,000 tons of rice from Taiwan and anti-Communist propaganda leaflets throughout Eastern China. These drops were called "Mainland Disaster Relief Drops From Taiwanese Compatriots" beginning a long history of operations involving supply airdrops by FCRA in Greater China and Southeast Asia.

In May 1950, the FCRA raised US$10 million with the goal of aiding refugees in British Hong Kong who had set up a camp at Rennie's Mill.

In summer of 1952, the FCRA was informed that the Social Welfare Office of British Hong Kong intended to end food rationing at the Rennie's Mill camp the following year in an effort to disperse the camp's inhabitants. The move by British authorities created a vacuum of authority which was filled by the FCRA and the ROC government by extension, essentially creating an enclave of the Republic of China inside British Hong Kong that would last until around 1997.

1960s 

In May 1960, the FCRA hoarded around 100,000 tons of rice in an attempt to ship it to the Mainland. The offer was rejected by the PRC, after which the FCRA prepared around 10,000 ration kits, each weighing around 1 pound, to be airlifted and dropped or otherwise smuggled into the mainland. Chiang Kai-shek said the following of the PRC's attempt to ignore the Nationalist relief offer:

1970s 

In 1971, the ROC was expelled from the United Nations and replaced with the PRC. Despite this, the Free China Relief Association conducted an operation to send 170,000 balloons filled with relief aid and propaganda leaflets across the Strait to the Mainland in collaboration with the Ministry of National Defense after the 1976 Tangshan earthquake. The move was made following an official rejection of aid shipments from the ROC by the PRC.

1980s 
In 1984 the organization gave financial and lifepath assistance to the hijackers of CAAC Flight 296.

In 1988, the FCRA sent the PRC US$100,000 to help Chinese flood victims. This marked the first successful instance of direct humanitarian assistance to the PRC from an ROC institution.

1990s 

In 1991, the association changed its name to the China Relief Association (中國災胞救助總會).

In July 1992, the FCRA donated US$300,000 to the Chinese Red Cross after a series of floods and droughts had affected six Mainland Chinese provinces.

In December 1993, the association donated NT $1,371,767 to benefit the victims of a tsunami that struck South Asia.

2000s 

In 2000, the association re-branded itself as the Chinese Association for Relief and Ensuing Services or "CARES" (中華救助總會) after significant downsizing and a transition away from international relief work, transforming itself effectively into an internal social welfare organisation with some international work still ongoing.

2010s 

The organisation's mission currently includes assisting the integration of Mainland spouses into Taiwanese society, providing services to disadvantaged, elderly and aboriginal groups on Taiwan, providing emergency relief to the same groups including care and assisted living services, participation in international humanitarian work, providing assistance to former refugees and their descendants in Thailand and Burma and Organising a regularly held Social Welfare Forum to improve existing welfare services.

Publications

External links 
Homepage

References 

Chiang Kai-shek
Anti-communist organizations
International political organizations
Organizations established in 1949
1949 establishments in Taiwan
Organizations based in Taipei
International organizations based in Taiwan
Foreign relations of Taiwan